In mathematics, a time dependent vector field is a construction in vector calculus which generalizes the concept of vector fields. It can be thought of as a vector field which moves as time passes. For every instant of time, it associates a vector to every point in a Euclidean space or in a manifold.

Definition
A time dependent vector field on a manifold M is a map from an open subset  on 

For every  such that the set

is nonempty,  is a vector field in the usual sense defined on the open set .

Associated differential equation
Given a time dependent vector field X on a manifold M, we can associate to it the following differential equation:

which is called nonautonomous by definition.

Integral curve

An integral curve of the equation above (also called an integral curve of X) is a map

such that ,  is an element of the domain of definition of X and

.

Equivalence with time-independent vector fields
A time-independent vector field  on  can be thought of as a vector field  on  where  does not depend on 

on  In coordinates,

Flow
The flow of a time dependent vector field X, is the unique differentiable map

such that for every ,

is the integral curve  of X that satisfies .

Properties
We define  as 

If  and  then 
,  is a diffeomorphism with inverse .

Applications
Let X and Y be smooth time dependent vector fields and  the flow of X. The following identity can be proved:

Also, we can define time dependent tensor fields in an analogous way, and prove this similar identity,  assuming that  is a smooth time dependent tensor field:

This last identity is useful to prove the Darboux theorem.

References
 Lee, John M., Introduction to Smooth Manifolds, Springer-Verlag, New York (2003) . Graduate-level textbook on smooth manifolds.

Differential geometry
Vector calculus